The United States House Oversight Committee investigation into the Biden family is an ongoing investigation by the United States House of Representatives into US President Joe Biden's alleged "involvement in his family's foreign business practices and international influence peddling schemes". The investigation was initiated on January 11, 2023, by Republican committee chairman James Comer and includes examination of the foreign business activities of Biden's son, Hunter, and brother, James. The committee is also investigating Twitter's involvement in the Hunter Biden laptop controversy.

Background
As Vice President during the Obama administration, Joe Biden brought with him significant foreign policy experience from his decades as a senator, notably relating to Ukraine, which the Obama administration encouraged to adopt economic and democratic reforms, with Biden spearheading the effort from the White House. 

In 2014, his son, Hunter, accepted a business consulting engagement with the Ukrainian energy company Burisma Holdings and was appointed to the company's board of directors. His father and the State Department expressed concerns about Hunter Biden's involvement with Burisma due to its history of corruption, and potential conflicts with Obama administration policy. Hunter Biden was also an international investment fund founder, notably in China. His uncle James joined him to purchase an international hedge fund in 2006.

Joe Biden has insisted he had no knowledge of, or investments in, his son's foreign business ventures. A 2020 investigation led by Republican senators Ron Johnson and Chuck Grassley found no evidence of wrongdoing by Joe Biden, noting only that Hunter Biden had used his family name to develop business relationships.

When Joe Biden began running for president in 2019, the Trump campaign sought to find evidence of possible financial impropriety and influence peddling among the Bidens. Trump personal attorney Rudy Giuliani led a team of associates that traveled to Ukraine during 2019. The Trump campaign and its allies noted that Burisma hired Hunter Biden despite his lack of energy expertise, though he had been hired to provide board-level corporate governance and transparency consulting services, as Burisma sought to improve its reputation to seek partnerships with Western companies.

As vice president, Joe Biden pressured the Ukrainian government to fire prosecutor general Viktor Shokin, later boasting that his effort worked. Trump allies alleged Shokin was fired to protect Burisma and Hunter Biden from corruption investigations, though the vice president was acting in accordance with American, European Union and International Monetary Fund policy, as Shokin himself was seen as corrupt and had allowed an investigation into Burisma to fall dormant.

In 2020, Trump pressured Ukrainian president Volodymyr Zelenskyy to falsely announce his government was investigating the Bidens, resulting in Trump's impeachment.

In October 2020, the New York Post reported on a laptop once belonging to Hunter Biden that contained tens of thousands of emails and documents. The laptop included two emails to Hunter Biden that passingly mentioned Joe Biden, in relation to business matters in both Ukraine and China; neither email indicated that Joe Biden was involved in any of the business matters. The laptop garnered significant attention from Republicans and conservative media as the Hunter Biden laptop controversy. Despite extensive scrutiny of the laptop contents by multiple parties, by September 2022 no clear evidence of criminal activity was found. Republicans promised during the 2022 midterm elections campaign to investigate the laptop and related matters, leading to the Oversight Committee investigation once they gained control of the House of Representatives in January 2023.

Proceedings
Committee chairman Comer launched the investigation on January 11, 2023, with a letter to Treasury secretary Janet Yellen regarding alleged Biden family "foreign business practices and international influence peddling schemes." Comer requested Yellen provide any suspicious activity reports (SARs) that banks may have generated related to Biden family business activities. Comer also wrote several former Twitter executives to request their testimony before the committee in February.

In early February, Comer sent letters requesting documents, records, and communications to Hunter Biden, his former business partner Eric Schwerin, and to James Biden. Abbe Lowell, a Hunter Biden attorney, rebuffed the request, responding in a letter that the committee did not have any legitimate legislative purpose and that Comer had "shamelessly maligned" his client.

First hearing

During the committee's first public hearing on February 8, Comer falsely asserted in a prepared opening statement that while Joe Biden was vice president, he had pressured Ukraine to remove its prosecutor general Viktor Shokin so as to end an investigation of Burisma, where Hunter Biden was employed and sat on its board. Comer referred to the allegation that was published in an October 2020 New York Post story but had been repeatedly debunked. During the hearing, Democratic committee member Dan Goldman challenged Comer, characterizing the allegation as "one-hundred percent false." Goldman had investigated the matter as lead counsel for Democrats during the first impeachment of Donald Trump, which involved allegations of Trump corruption relating to Ukraine.

In his opening statement, Comer also cited the New York Post to assert Joe Biden "had spent time" with a Burisma advisor at an April 2015  dinner party in Washington D.C. The advisor, Vadym Pozharsky, had sent Hunter Biden an email thanking him for the "opportunity" to meet his father, though the email did not confirm the meeting actually occurred. Joe Biden's office denied such a meeting, or that if it did happen it was fleeting and inconsequential; guests at the dinner said Joe Biden appeared only briefly to see an old friend. Comer's opening statement asserted that the Post account showed Joe Biden had lied as a presidential candidate when he claimed he had never talked to his son about business matters.

Prior to the hearing, many Republicans had alleged Twitter and the FBI had colluded to suppress the October 2020 New York Post story on Hunter Biden's laptop. Four former Twitter employees testified at the first committee hearing. Yoel Roth, former global head of trust and safety, testified the FBI did not tell Twitter the laptop was fake or hacked. He and former deputy general counsel James Baker denied the FBI encouraged Twitter to suppress the story. Baker, the FBI general counsel until 2018, said he had not communicated with the FBI during the episode. Republican committee member Jim Jordan insisted without evidence there had been collusion, stating, "I think you guys wanted to take it down, and I think you guys got played by the FBI."

Democrat Alexandria Ocasio-Cortez inquired about a 2019 Trump tweet in which he said she and three other Democratic congresswoman of color should "go back and help fix the totally broken and crime infested places from which they came." Former Twitter content moderation team member Anika Collier Navaroli said the tweet violated rules that explicitly banned the expression "go back to where you came from." Collier Navaroli argued to managers that the tweet should be removed, but the recommendation was denied, and instead that expression was removed from the deletion rule, allowing Trump's tweet to remain.

Two Republican committee members suggested the Twitter witnesses may have committed crimes, one suggesting they might be arrested. Two Democrats on the panel suggested to Comer that the remarks constituted witness intimidation or threats; Comer declined to intervene.

The hearing disclosed that in September 2019 Trump tweeted that Chrissy Teigen was "filthy mouthed"; in response, Teigen tweeted vulgarities directed at Trump. The Trump White House later asked Twitter to remove the tweet, but the request was declined. Committee Democrats suggested hypocrisy among Republicans for complaining of government influence on Twitter and suppression of free speech.

Later developments
Jamie Raskin, Democratic ranking member of the Oversight Committee, disclosed in a March 2023 letter to Comer that the chairman had quietly issued sweeping subpoenas of fourteen years of banking records of Hunter Biden associates who were involved in a joint venture related to CEFC China Energy. Raskin alleged cooperation between committee Republicans and a Trump attorney to quietly drop an investigation that had been initiated by the Oversight Committee when it was controlled by Democrats into whether Trump improperly profited from his presidency. Comer professed ignorance of the Trump investigation and denied he had worked with Trump attorneys to end it.

Conspiracy theory
In January 2023, an anonymous Twitter account posted a rental application found on Hunter Biden's laptop, leading to a false claim that in 2018 Hunter Biden had paid $49,910 in monthly rent for his father's Delaware residence where classified documents had been found. The false allegation quickly spread across conservative media. A Breitbart story that speculated Hunter Biden may have had access to classified documents was retweeted by House Republican Conference chair Elise Stefanik who added that "Joe Biden and the Biden Crime Family are corrupt and significant threats to national security. Our Republican House Majority will hold them accountable." Comer suggested it was evidence that Hunter Biden may have been funneling foreign money to his father. The document actually showed quarterly rental payments for office space at the House of Sweden in Washington, D.C. On his Fox News program, host Tucker Carlson echoed Comer's false suggestion of Hunter Biden malfeasance; days later Hunter Biden's attorneys wrote Carlson and Fox News demanding they correct the falsehood or risk a defamation lawsuit.

See also 
BHR Partners
Biden-Ukraine conspiracy theory
CEFC China Energy
Hunter Biden

References

External links
 Biden Family Investigation, House Oversight Committee

 Comer Announces New Actions in Biden Family Investigation, press release, January 11, 2023

Presidency of Joe Biden